was a  after Ninju and before Ten'an. This period spanned the years from November 854  through February 857.

Change of era
 February 1, 854 : The new era name was created to mark an event or series of events.  The previous era ended and the new one commenced in Ninju 4, on the 29th day of the 11th month of 854.

Events of the Saikō era
 April 21, 854 (Saikō 1, 13th day of the 6th month): The sadaijin Minamoto no Tokiwa, also known as Minamoto no Tsune, died at age 43.
 855 (Saikō 2, 1st month): The Emishi organized a rebellion; and in response, a force of 1,000 men and provisions were sent to the north.
 855 (Saikō 2, 5th month): The head of the great statute of Buddha in the Tōdai-ji fell off; and in consequence, the emperor ordered the then dainagon Fujiwara no Yoshisuke, the brother of sadaijin Yoshifusa, to be in charge of gathering the gifts of the pious from throughout the empire to make another head for the Daibutsu.

Notes

References
 Brown, Delmer M. and Ichirō Ishida, eds. (1979).  Gukanshō: The Future and the Past. Berkeley: University of California Press. ;  OCLC 251325323
 Nussbaum, Louis-Frédéric and Käthe Roth. (2005).  Japan encyclopedia. Cambridge: Harvard University Press. ;  OCLC 58053128
 Titsingh, Isaac. (1834). Nihon Ōdai Ichiran; ou,  Annales des empereurs du Japon.  Paris: Royal Asiatic Society, Oriental Translation Fund of Great Britain and Ireland. OCLC 5850691
 Varley, H. Paul. (1980). A Chronicle of Gods and Sovereigns: Jinnō Shōtōki of Kitabatake Chikafusa. New York: Columbia University Press.  ;  OCLC 6042764

External links 
 National Diet Library, "The Japanese Calendar" -- historical overview plus illustrative images from library's collection

Japanese eras
9th century in Japan
854 beginnings
857 endings